Azócar is a Spanish surname. Notable people with the surname include:

 Jose Azocar (born 1996), Venezuelan baseball player
 Juan Carlos Azócar (born 1995), Venezuelan footballer
 Oscar Azócar (1965–2010), Venezuelan baseball player
 Patricio Aylwin Azócar (1918–2016), Chilean president

Spanish-language surnames